Márton Eppel (born 26 October 1991) is a Hungarian professional football player who plays as a forward for Diósgyőr and the Hungary national team.

Career

NEC
Eppel moved to N.E.C. on a season-long loan in August 2011. N.E.C had a first option to buy him during his period at the club.

Honvéd
Eppel won the 2016–17 Nemzeti Bajnokság I season with Budapest Honvéd FC and he also became top scorer of the Nemzeti Bajnokság I.

Kairat
On 2 July 2018, FC Kairat announced the signing of Eppel on an 18-month contract. And Eppel immediately scored five goals out of ten in the gate of the club UE Engordany from Andorra in the first qualifying round of the 2018–19 UEFA Europa League.

Cercle Brugge
On 14 January 2020, Cercle Brugge announced the signing of Eppel on a contract until the end of the 2019–20 season.

Honvéd
On 20 October 2020, Eppel signed with Budapest Honvéd FC returning for a second stint.

Diósgyőr
On 6 January 2022, Eppel joined Diósgyőr.

International
Eppel debuted for the Hungary national team against Russia in a friendly match at Groupama Aréna, Budapest on 5 June 2017.
He also scored his first goal in his debut match against Russia, though into his own net.

Four days later, on 9 June 2017, he played his second match against Andorra in a 1–0 defeat in the 2018 FIFA World Cup qualifiers in Andorra.

Career statistics

Club

References

External links
 Profile at HLSZ 
 Profile at MLSZ 
 Profile at NEC Nijmegen official website
 

1991 births
Living people
Footballers from Budapest
Hungarian footballers
Hungarian expatriate footballers
Hungary international footballers
Association football forwards
MTK Budapest FC players
NEC Nijmegen players
Paksi FC players
Dunaújváros PASE players
Budapest Honvéd FC players
FC Kairat players
Cercle Brugge K.S.V. players
Diósgyőri VTK players
Nemzeti Bajnokság I players
Nemzeti Bajnokság II players
Eredivisie players
Kazakhstan Premier League players
Belgian Pro League players
Expatriate footballers in the Netherlands
Expatriate footballers in Kazakhstan
Expatriate footballers in Belgium
Hungarian expatriate sportspeople in the Netherlands
Hungarian expatriate sportspeople in Kazakhstan
Hungarian expatriate sportspeople in Belgium